The Colonel Fletcher Building at 602–632 Broadway, in Downtown San Diego was the site of some of the retail history of San Diego. The building is at the northeast corner of 6th and Broadway; Broadway was originally named D Street.

It was built by "Colonel" Ed Fletcher around 1906–1908 along with Frank Salmans, and designed by architect Edward Quayle of the Quayle Brothers (who would later do the 1935 renovation of the Walker Scott Building). It was remodeled around 2005 by Champion Development Group.

Originally it was a two-story building housing the Barnett-Stine Co. department store. Two more stories were added. 

Barnett-Stine went out of business in 1911 and Holzwasser's department store, opened in the building.  In 1919, Holzwasser's moved to a new, larger building, now known as the Walker Scott Building. (Holzwasser's would go out of business in 1933 and the first Walker Scott store would open there.)

The Owl Drug Company was then located in the building.

The building was renovated in 2008.

References

Buildings and structures in San Diego